Nine Men is a 1943 British war film, set in the Western Desert Campaign during the Second World War.

Production
The film is an Ealing Studios production and marked the first fiction film assignment for celebrated documentary film director Harry Watt, who had worked at the Crown Film Unit. With only a £20,000 budget, the film's exterior desert sequences were shot at Margam Sands, Glamorgan.

Plot
In a barrack room at a Battle Training Ground in England, a platoon of conscripts are complaining about blisters and are impatient to get into action with the enemy. Sergeant Jack Watson tells them that they need a little bit extra to be successful in combat, which he illustrates with a story from his experience in the Western Desert Campaign.

His story is then shown in flashback. Lieutenant Crawford, Sergeant Watson and the seven men under their command are travelling through the Libyan desert in an Allied convoy, when their lorry becomes stuck in the sand and the convoy moves on without them. As they work to free themselves, they are attacked by German aircraft, injuring Crawford and Johnson and setting fire to the lorry. Setting off on foot and carrying the wounded, they struggle through a sandstorm until they come across a derelict hut. Lieutenant Crawford orders them to hold out there until help arrives but then dies. With only a limited supply of ammunition and their own wits to help them survive, they are then besieged by Italian troops. By various ruses and skilful use of their weapons, they are able to hold out until the Italians make a final assault; as the British soldiers use the last of their bullets and finally resort to a bayonet charge, reinforcements arrive supported by tanks, whereupon the Italians surrender.

Back at the barrack room, Watson concludes his story as the bugle sounds for dinner.

Cast
In common with many Ealing productions of the time, the film used a largely unknown cast, only a few of whom were full-time professional actors. The film is known to be actor Grant Sutherland's last performance before retiring from acting to pursue a career in business. Sutherland had featured in such films as Michael Powell's The Edge of the World and The Spy in Black.

Reception
Although the battle scenes were considered to be effective and particularly graphic at the time, the portrayal of the Italian soldiers was described by the Manchester Guardian as "impossibly instead of credibly cowardly".

References

External links 
 
 

1943 films
1943 war films
Ealing Studios films
British World War II films
World War II films made in wartime
North African campaign films
British black-and-white films
1940s English-language films
Films directed by Harry Watt
Films produced by Michael Balcon
Films set in Libya
1940s British films